Inverurie and District is one of the nineteen wards used to elect members of the Aberdeenshire Council. It elects four Councillors.

Councillors

Election results

2022 Election
2022 Aberdeenshire Council election

2017 Election
2017 Aberdeenshire Council election

2012 Election
2012 Aberdeenshire Council election

2007 Election
2007 Aberdeenshire Council election

By-election
Following the election of Colin Clark (Scottish Conservative and Unionist Party) to Westminster at the 2017 United Kingdom general election on 8 June and his subsequent resignation as Councillor for Inverurie & District ward, a by-election was called on Thursday, 12 October 2017.

2017 By-election
Inverurie & District By-election 2017 - Aberdeenshire Council

References

Inverurie
Wards of Aberdeenshire